Raynald of Burgundy (1059–1090) was a son of Henry of Burgundy and grandson of Robert I, Duke of Burgundy. He was abbot of Flavigny from 1084 to his death in 1090. Philip I of France said in 1085 that Raynald "was joined to him in the flesh".  After his premature death, the Abbey of Flavigny was without an abbot for 7 years, except for a brief period of 2 months under Elmuin.

References

1090 deaths
1059 births